Navy Operational Global Atmospheric Prediction System Model (NOGAPS) is a global numerical weather prediction computer model run by Fleet Numerical. This mathematical model is run four times a day and produces weather forecasts.  Along with the ECMWF's Integrated Forecast System (IFS), the Canadian Global Environmental Multiscale Model (GEM) it is one of several synoptic scale medium-range models in general use.

References

External links 
NOGAPS Portal

Weather prediction
Numerical climate and weather models